Start (formerly known as Start in Salford) is a mental health charity based in Salford. Founded in 1993 by the CEO Bernadette Conlon. Start has grown in the two decades since and is now located in Brunswick House in the heart of Salford. Start employs 11 staff and is helped by a further 68 volunteers.

Inspiring Minds Service
The Inspiring Minds service is a referral only project offering support for adults experiencing mental health issues. A range of creative activities and horticulture are offered within a group setting at a fully equipped arts complex. The aim of the intervention is to build confidence, self esteem, enhance mood, reduce anxiety and combat isolation. They also help people plan their next step into education, leisure, work or volunteering after completing the programme.

Reach Out: Start to end suicide
START celebrated its 25 years of working with the people of Salford to recover from mental ill health using creative therapeutic arts in 2018. As part of this commemorative year, START formed a campaign entitled 'Reach Out: Start to End Suicide', which promoted, through engagement with the people of Salford, reaching out to friends, family members and colleagues that may be at risk of suicide.

References

Charities based in Greater Manchester
Organisations based in Salford